Md Shawkat Imam was a colonel in the Bangladesh Army. He held numerous posts, including commander of UN peacekeeping operations. He was the Sector Commander of Bangladesh Rifles in Teknaf when he was killed in the 2009 Bangladesh Rifles Mutiny.

Early life
Imam was born on 20 May 1961, in Tangail, East Pakistan.

Career
Imam completed the Bangladesh Public Service Commission course. He served as commander of the Bangladesh Rifles battalion 23. After the pro-democracy protests in Myanmar in 2007, the Junta deported Bangladeshi monks. Colonel Shawkat Imam was in charge of the area at the time.

Personal life
Imam married Nuzhat Ahsan, and had one daughter, Sumera Azreen.

Death
Imam was killed in the 2009 Bangladesh Rifles Mutiny. He was buried with full state honours along with the other officers killed in the mutiny at the National Parade Square. Imam was buried in the Bangladesh Army Graveyard in Banani, Dhaka on 2 March 2009.

References

Bangladesh Army colonels
2009 deaths
1961 births
People from Tangail District